Dutrow is a surname. Notable people with the surname include:

 Anthony W. Dutrow (born 1958), American racehorse trainer
 Richard E. Dutrow Jr. (born 1959), American racehorse trainer
 Richard E. Dutrow Sr. (1937–1999), American racehorse trainer

See also

References